Peter Nicholson (born 1946) is an Australian political cartoonist, caricaturist and sculptor. He has won five Walkley Awards.

Nicholson has also produced animated political cartoons for the Australian Broadcasting Corporation and the TV series Fast Forward, and was involved in the Rubbery Figures television series.

He married Mary Nicholson in 1972 and had three children. Tom Nicholson, Emily Nicholson and Dan Nicholson.

Walkley awards

"Avenue of Prime Ministers" in the Botanical Gardens in Ballarat
Nicholson created the busts of Malcolm Fraser, Bob Hawke, Paul Keating, John Howard, Kevin Rudd and Julia Gillard, which are part of the Prime Ministers Avenue in the Ballarat Botanical Gardens.

See also
 Joyce Nicholson

References

External links
 Political cartoons 1980–1985? / Nicholson - held and digitised by the National Library of Australia
 Nicholson - archived website from 2000+
 Nicholson cartoons
 Speech by Gough Whitlam referring to reaction to Nicholson cartoon

Australian caricaturists
Australian editorial cartoonists
1946 births
Living people
People educated at Scotch College, Melbourne
20th-century Australian sculptors
21st-century Australian sculptors